The mottled eel (Anguilla nebulosa), also known as the African mottled eel, the Indian longfin eel, the Indian mottled eel, the long-finned eel or the river eel, is a demersal, catadromous eel in the family Anguillidae. It was described by John McClelland in 1844. It is a tropical, freshwater eel which is known from East Africa, Bangladesh, Andaman Islands, Mozambique, Malawi, Sri Lanka, Sumatra, and Indonesia and recently from Madagascar. The eels spend most of their lives in freshwater at a depth range of 3–10 metres, but migrate to the Indian Ocean to breed. Males can reach a maximum total length of 121 centimetres and a maximum weight of 7,000 grams. The eels feed primarily off of benthic crustaceans, mollusks, finfish and worms.

Even though widely distributed, the Mottled eel is listed as Near Threatened by the IUCN Redlist. Although the eels are too large for use in aquariums, they are commercial in subsistence fisheries.

The exact classification of the species was a debate in recent times, where some major fish websites (ex. Fish Base) classified the species under the name A. nebulosa. But according to the IUCN Red List 2015 version, the fish species should be classified as A. bengalensis with some subspecies.

References

Age and growth of Anguilla bicolor and Anguilla nebulosa:a case study

Anguillidae
Fish described in 1844
Freshwater fish of Sri Lanka
Taxobox binomials not recognized by IUCN